Dean Waldon Whiteway (born July 20, 1944) is a Canadian politician.  He served in the House of Commons of Canada from 1974 to 1979, as a member of the Progressive Conservative Party.

Early life and career

Whiteway was born in Shelburne, Nova Scotia, and has a Bachelor of Arts degree from Brandon University in Manitoba and a Master's degree from Harvard. He has taught at Providence Bible College and Seminary near Winnipeg. Whiteway is a Mennonite Brethren, and a member of the Evangelical Fellowship of Canada.

Member of Parliament

Whiteway first ran for the House of Commons in the 1968 election as a Social Credit candidate in Dauphin, and finished fourth against Progressive Conservative Gordon Ritchie. He joined the Progressive Conservative Party after the election, and ran under its banner in Selkirk in the 1972 election. He narrowly lost to incumbent New Democrat Doug Rowland.

He was elected on his third attempt, defeating Rowland in a 1974 election rematch. The Liberal Party of Canada won a majority government in the 1974 election, and Whiteway entered parliament as a member of the official opposition. He was on the right wing of his party, and opposed abortion, supported capital punishment, and spoke against federal funding for Planned Parenthood. On one occasion, he suggested that danger to a woman's health should be removed as permissible grounds for abortion. He also gained some notoriety for pitching a tent on Parliament Hill to protest a post office closing in his riding.

The Selkirk riding was eliminated by redistribution for the 1979 federal election. Whiteway was forced to seek reelection in the more challenging riding of Winnipeg—Birds Hill. He lost to New Democratic Party candidate Bill Blaikie, even though the Progressive Conservatives won a minority government.

Reform Party activist

Whiteway campaigned for the No side in the 1992 Charlottetown Accord referendum.  He sought a return to the House of Commons in the 1993 election, after winning a four-person contest for the Reform Party nomination in Provencher.  Whiteway argued that the Reform Party was a natural home for evangelical Christians, and spoke of bringing "some moral fibre to Parliament".  He lost to Liberal David Iftody, and told reporters that he would probably not run for public office again.

Whiteway was involved in abortive plans to create a provincial branch of the Reform Party in 1994.  He indicated that he had no interest in becoming a candidate himself.

Headmaster

Whiteway moved to British Columbia after the 1993 election. In 1998, he accepted a position as headmaster of Faith Heritage, a private and non-denominational Christian school in Syracuse, New York.  In 2007, he became headmaster of Plumstead Christian School in Plumsteadville, Pennsylvania, where, as of July 2010 he serves as Chancellor. As of September 2011 Whiteway serves as Headmaster of Concord Christian Academy in Concord, New Hampshire.

Electoral record

Footnotes

External links
 

1944 births
Living people
Members of the House of Commons of Canada from Manitoba
Progressive Conservative Party of Canada MPs
Harvard University alumni
Brandon University alumni